, often referred to as simply , (5 October 1949 – 3 January 2014) was a Japanese singer and television personality.

Born in Nishinari-ku, Osaka, Japan, to a Zainichi-issei Korean father Gonzaburou ( 權三郞) and a Japanese mother Mitsuko Yashiki, he started his singing career in the 1970s in Gion, Kyoto, and then moved to Shimokitazawa, Tokyo in 1980.

In 1981, he sang the theme song of the first movie of the Mobile Suit Gundam, Suna no Jūjika and it sold thirteen thousand CDs. He moved back to Osaka in 1982 and had been active mainly in the Kansai region since then. He sang many songs about Osaka such as Yappa Suki Yanen (1986), Osaka Koi Monogatari (1989), Nametonka (1990) and Tokyo (1993). He was popular in Kansai as a frank television presenter. Having made public his dislike of Tokyo, Takajin rarely made appearances on TV stations in Tokyo. He also kept a blacklist of people he wouldn't appear with. His trademark was sunglasses. He wore them because of his taste and glaucoma.

In January 2012, he announced that he had been diagnosed with esophageal cancer, and that he would take a leave and concentrate on its treatment. He made a short comeback in 2013, but he died on January 3, 2014.

Takajin owned five racehorses between years 1998-2006.

Programs
 Takajin Mune Ippai
 Takajin No Money
 Takajin no Sokomade Itte Iinkai
 Takajin ONE MAN
 Muhaha no Takajin (Kansai TV)

References

External links 

 
 

1949 births
2014 deaths
20th-century Japanese musicians
Culture in Osaka
Japanese television personalities
Japanese racehorse owners and breeders
Deaths from cancer in Japan
Deaths from esophageal cancer
Japanese people of Korean descent
Musicians from Osaka
Musicians from Kyoto
Musicians from Setagaya
20th-century Japanese male singers
20th-century Japanese singers